McCoysburg is an unincorporated community in Hanging Grove Township, Jasper County, Indiana.

Alfred McCoy was an original owner of the town site.

Geography

References

Unincorporated communities in Jasper County, Indiana
Unincorporated communities in Indiana